Haloarcula (common abbreviation Har.) is a genus of extreme halophilic Archaea in the class of Halobactaria.

Cell Structure
Haloarcula species can be distinguished from other genera in the family Halobacteriaceae by the presence of specific derivatives of TGD-2 polar lipids. H. quadrata has predominantly flat, square-shaped, somewhat pleomorphic cells.

Metabolism
H. quadrata was first isolated when researchers were attempting to culture Haloquadratum walsbyi, a haloarchaeon that was thought to be unculturable until 2004. Similar to other halophilic archaea, Haloarcula species grow optimally at 40–45 °C. Growth appears in sheets of up to 65 cells often in the shape of a square or triangle.

Taxonomy
The genus of Haloarcula was long grouped with other halophilic archaea such as Halobacterium until genomic analysis prompted to reorder this genus in the new family of Haloarculaceae.

Ecology 
Haloarcula species are found in neutral saline environments such as salt lakes, marine salterns, and saline soils. Like other members of the family Halobacteriaceae, Haloarcula requires at least 1.5 M NaCl for growth, but grow optimally in 2.0 to 4.5 M NaCl.

References

Further reading

External links

Haloarcula at BacDive -  the Bacterial Diversity Metadatabase

Archaea genera